is a Shinto cult. Originally it revolved solely around Gozu Tenno, but during the Separation of Shinto and Buddhism of the Meiji era the government mandated it shift to revolving around Susanoo.

The main shrine is Yasaka Shrine in Kyoto or Hiromine Shrine in Hyogo Prefecture.

Gozu Tenno was originally a Buddhist-style Onmyōdō deity, and is generally considered to be the guardian deity of Jetavana, the monastery where the Buddha studied. In China, he was influenced by Taoism, and in Japan, he further merged with Susanoo, the Kami of Shinto. This is because both Gozu Tenno and Susanoo were considered to be plague gods. He was considered to be the Buddha Bhaisajyaguru.

The cult began in the Heian period, and the original form of the Gion faith was to prevent epidemics by comforting the god of pestilence. In the late 10th century, the citizens of Kyoto began to hold a festival at Yasaka Shrine (then known as Gion Shrine) which became known as Gion Matsuri. By the Middle Ages, the Gion faith had spread throughout the country, and Gion shrines or Gyototenno shrines were created to enshrine Gyotenno, and the Goryokai (or Tenno Festival) was held as a ritual procession.

In the Meiji era (1868-1912), the Separation of Buddhism and Shinto banned Buddhist rituals at shrines and prohibited the use of Buddhist words such as "Gozu Tenno" and "Gion" in the names of deities and company names, so Gion Shrine and Gozu Tenno Shrine became shrines dedicated to Susanoo and changed their names.

There are many other cults of Susanoo that are not derived from the Gion faith, but rather from indigenous Shinto traditions without Buddhist influence.

References

External links 
 祇園信仰研究会 - 有志による研究会

Shinbutsu shūgō
Gion faith
Shinto cults